Perth Thundersticks is an Australian field hockey club based in Perth, Western Australia. The club was established in 1991 as a men's only team competing in the Australian Hockey League before expanding to include women's teams, WA Diamonds, under the same banner as part of the 7 clubs to compete in Hockey Australia's new premier domestic competition, Hockey One.

Perth Thundersticks will compete for the first time in the inaugural season of Hockey One, which will be contested from late September through to mid November 2019.

The Thundersticks were one of the most successful teams in the history of the Australian Hockey League, winning nine men's titles and producing countless international players.

Uniform
The club colours are WA's traditional colours, black, gold and white.

Home Stadium 
Perth Thundersticks are based out of the Perth Hockey Stadium in Western Australia's capital city, Perth. The stadium has a capacity of 6,000 spectators.

Throughout the Hockey One league, Perth Thundersticks will play a number of home games at the stadium.

Teams

Men's team
Details and team rosters to be confirmed.

Women's team
Details and team rosters to be confirmed.

History
Perth Thundersticks, along with six other teams, are part of Hockey Australia's development of hockey. The club unites both WA's male and female teams, with the women's team previously being known as the WA Diamonds.

The club name and identity celebrates the Thundersticks' success from the 1990s and 2000s when they were a dominant force in the men's Australian Hockey League. The club retained the state's iconic black, gold and white colours.

References

https://web.archive.org/web/20070307114712/http://www.hockeywa.org.au/thunderstruck/thundersticks.cfm

External links
 https://web.archive.org/web/20070307114712/http://www.hockeywa.org.au/thunderstruck/thundersticks.cfm

Australian field hockey clubs
Sporting clubs in Perth, Western Australia
Representative sports teams of Western Australia
Field hockey in Western Australia